Waqraqucha (Quechua waqra horn, qucha lake, lagoon, "horn lake", hispanicized spelling Huacracocha) is a lake in Peru located in the Junín Region, Yauli Province, Suitucancha District. It is situated east of the Paryaqaqa or Waruchiri mountain range. Waqraqucha lies north of a lake named Wayllakancha (Huaylacancha) and the smaller lakes called Antaqucha (Antacocha), Wirukancha (Huirocancha) and Llaksaqucha (Yacsacocha).

References

Lakes of Peru
Lakes of Junín Region